Port Adelaide station is a railway station located on the Outer Harbor line. Situated in the north-western Adelaide suburb of Alberton, it is 11.7 kilometres from Adelaide station.

History
The line from Adelaide to Port Adelaide was the second railway in South Australia (after the Goolwa-Port Elliot railway began in 1854) and opened in 1856. The original line from Adelaide ran directly to Port Dock station, the site now occupied by the National Railway Museum. Various lines then continued through the Port Adelaide's streets to the wharves and, from 1878, along St Vincent Street to the seaside town of Semaphore.

Congestion at Port Dock railway station and the delays involved in operating trains along busy streets in the centre of the Port resulted in construction of a viaduct and a new bridge across the Port River in 1916. This diverted through trains to Semaphore and Outer Harbor via a new station named Commercial Road, the current station. Port Adelaide Commercial Road was quite a substantial building, with long platforms, an overall roof and a signal cabin. This quickly took over from Port Dock as the town's principal railway station.

As rail traffic decreased through the 1960s and 70s, facilities at Commercial Road station were gradually reduced. In the early 1970s the roof was removed, platforms shortened and the street level station buildings reconstructed. The ticket office closed in January 1979 and the station has been unstaffed since then. With the closure of Port Dock station in 1981, Commercial Road station was subsequently renamed Port Adelaide. In November 2009, the station and viaduct closed for refurbishment, reopening on 9 May 2010. Currently, Port Adelaide station's two elevated platforms are on a viaduct that carries the railway across Commercial Road. The station is unstaffed and has no buildings or other facilities except basic passenger shelters on each platform.

This allowed freight traffic from Dry Creek via the Rosewater loop to access industrial facilities on the Lefevre Peninsula and the container terminal at Pelican Point. In August 2008, freight traffic was diverted to operate via the Mary MacKillop Bridge downstream of the Port Adelaide harbour. The disused standard gauge rails have been removed, however the dual gauge sleepers remain in place to allow for the entire Outer Harbor line to be gauge converted in the future.

Services by platform

Transport links

|}

References

Further reading
Rails Through Swamp and Sand – A History of the Port Adelaide Railway.  M. Thompson pub. Port Dock Station Railway Museum (1988)

External links

Track map SA Signal & Track
Flickr gallery

Railway stations in Adelaide
Railway stations in Australia opened in 1916